

Debar Lake is an artificial lake in the western portion of North Macedonia near the town of Debar after which it is named. A dam at Špilje blocks the Black Drin, the second longest river in the country.

References

Bibliography

Gallery

External links 

Lakes of North Macedonia
Reservoirs in Europe
Drainage basins of the Adriatic Sea